The Madison is a novelty dance that was popular in the late 1950s to mid-1960s.

Description and history
It was created and first danced in Columbus, Ohio, in 1957. The local popularity of the dance and record in Baltimore, Maryland, came to the attention of the producers of The Buddy Deane Show in 1960, which led to other dance shows picking it up.
 
The Madison is a line dance that features a regular back-and-forth pattern interspersed with called steps. Its popularity inspired dance teams and competitions, as well as various recordings, and today it is still sometimes performed as a nostalgic dance. The Madison is featured in the John Waters movie Hairspray (1988), and it continues to be performed in the Broadway musical Hairspray. Both the film and the musical feature one of many songs released during the Madison "craze" in the US.

The jazz pianist Ray Bryant recorded "Madison Time" for Columbia Records in 1959. Billboard stated that "The footwork for the Madison dance is carefully and clearly diagrammed for the terpers."  The Ray Bryant version was the version featured in the film Hairspray.  The other popular version was by Al Brown & The Tunetoppers.  Another version was recorded by radio presenter Alan Freeman for Decca Records in 1962.

An example of a 1960 song and album featuring music for the Madison is The Tunetoppers at The Madison Dance Party, with calls by Al Brown.

The Madison basic, danced in the film Hairspray, is as follows:

Step left forward
Place right beside left (no weight) and clap
Step back on right
Move left foot back and across the right
Move left foot to the left
Move left foot back and across the right

Called steps included the Double Cross, the Cleveland Box, The Basketball (with Wilt Chamberlain), the Big "M", the "T" Time, the Jackie Gleason, the Birdland, and The Rifleman. "The Jackie Gleason" is based on a tap dance movement known as "Shuffle Off to Buffalo". Additional called sequences are: Two Up and Two Back, Big Boss Cross in Front, Make a "T", the Box, Cuddle Me, and Flying High. "Away We Go" may be the same as "The Jackie Gleason". 

Time magazine noted the Madison in April 1960.

The Madison dance has become very popular in the Kingdom of Cambodia and Kampuchea Krom (Mekong delta). It was introduced to Cambodia in the 1960s and remains a very popular dance at wedding banquets and other parties. The largest Madison dance in the world took place in Siem Reap, Cambodia on 15 April 2015 in celebration of the Cambodian New Year, involving 2,015 participants.

Gallery

Examples in motion pictures 
 
 In a famous sequence in Jean-Luc Godard's 1964 film Bande à part (Band of Outsiders, 1964), the main characters engage in a dance, which is not named in the film, but which the actors later referred to as the "Madison dance". The music and choreography are, however, unrelated to the Madison.
 The dance is performed by a large group in the original (non-musical) version of John Waters' Hairspray
 In The Rocky Horror Picture Show (1975), Brad (played by Barry Bostwick) calls out, "Say, do any of you guys know how to Madison?" after the Time Warp dance. However, the dance is not performed in the film.
 In Monsieur Ibrahim (2003), Lola Naymark does a Madison-like dance at 42 minutes and at 1 hour 18 minutes a group of Turkish youth appears to be doing a facsimile of the dance as well.   The song by Olivier Despax and the Gamblers is featured.
 In The Go-Getter (2007), Lou Taylor Pucci, Zooey Deschanel and Jena Malone all dance the "Madison" as an homage to Godard's Bande à part.
In the Netflix series Maniac (2018) episode 5, the characters played by Rome Kanda, Emma Stone, and Jonah Hill dance the Madison.
In the Hulu miniseries 11.22.63 (2016) [based on the 2011 titular Stephen King novel 11/22/63] Episode 3 "Other People, Other Rooms" features students and Sadie Dunhill doing The Madison.
The movie Le Week-End (2013) ends with the main characters Nick and Morgan dancing in the midst of the café recreating the scene from Bande à part.

Notes

External links

Columbus Music History with definitive origin article
Article on origins
The Madison dance scene from  Godard's Bande à part
Group Dances of the 1950s including description of the Madison
Newest Shuffle: The Madison. Time April 4, 1960.

Line dances
Novelty and fad dances